Men's Premiership Trophy: ?

Women's Premiership Trophy: ?

State Championships by Club

See also

Lacrosse in Australia

References

Queensland
Queensland
Lacrosse
Lacrosse